The Tuckahoe River is a  blackwater river in southern New Jersey in the United States.

One of the few blackwater rivers in the northeastern United States, the river drains an area of the southern Pinelands and empties into the Atlantic Ocean.

Course
The lower  form a widening estuary through Great Cedar Swamp downstream from its head of navigation at Tuckahoe.

Tributaries
 Cedar Swamp Creek

See also
 List of rivers of New Jersey

References

External links
 Tuckahoe River photographs by Michael Hogan
 U.S. Geological Survey: NJ stream gaging stations

Rivers of Atlantic County, New Jersey
Rivers of Cape May County, New Jersey
Rivers in the Pine Barrens (New Jersey)
Rivers of New Jersey
Tributaries of the Great Egg Harbor River
Wild and Scenic Rivers of the United States